Universe Symphony is the 3rd orchestral concert work by the Turkish composer Fazıl Say. Universe Symphony's world premiere took place in Salzburg Festival on 7 October 2012.

Universe Symphony is based on astronomy research that is variable and parallel to the changes in science. Fazıl Say's work evolved out of data collected in 2012 in this field of study. In this respect, The Big Bang, expansion of the universe, and Gliese 581 g’s earth-like appearance means finding the ‘God particle’ in dark matter may not be a fact for the modern age of science. As a result, the Composer evolved his work out of today's data to create a fictional story. The following Movements describe a blend of that research and Fazil Say's inspiration for composing his Universe Symphony.

Movements

I- Expansion of the Universe

The theory of the expansion of the universe is a mark in the 21st Century's science of astrophysics. The vastness (13.4 Billion Light Years) of space is getting bigger; starting with The Big Bang through to today. Fazıl Say's music also seeks an enlargement of space, reflecting the mathematics of rhythm and harmony as an expansion. The increase in scale appears as 3/8+4/8+5/8+6/8+7/8. There is symbolism in the major tonality (nature), minor tonality (humans), and atonality (chaos) that is covered intensely throughout the first part of Universe.

II – Venus

Venus is a planet that represents femininity and beauty throughout astrology and the history of humankind. According to astronomers, however, Venus is a much different place. It has a volcanic structure, is earth-like in size, and its temperature is almost 800 degrees even though it is very close to the Earth. There is also speculation in the world of science that billions of years ago Venus and Earth crashed, and it's out of this idea that Fazıl Say created a fantasy with his work.
 
According to Say's fantasy, there was life on Venus that ended with a meteor shower, and the composition tells a story about those last minutes of life. The Bass flute, Theremin, and English horn symbolize the people of Venus while the Waterphone is the voice of their fear. Venus is represented by tritone intervals and strong hits of trumpets to represent a meteor shower.

III - Storm in Jupiter

Jupiter is the biggest planet in the Solar System and it symbolizes The War in astrology. As we know, there is an extraordinary storm on Jupiter which started between 300 and 400 years ago. The storm creates huge volcanic explosions with its power, and winds that reach up to 8,000 kilometers per hour. In this part of the composition, the notes E and C# form the tonality of the piece; they are also the sounds of NASA's frequencies. Storm in Jupiter has components like a wind machine to symbolize the storm, tremolo effects of percussive instruments, and the themes of the brass and wind instruments.

IV – Earth-like Planet Gliese 581g

For science and humankind alike, one of the most important questions we can ask is: “Are there any life forms in space?” Therefore, great attention is paid to physical, chemical, and atmospheric similarities between the earth and other planets. Scientists recently discovered the “Gliese 581” extra solar planet; the Sun of the “Gliese planetary system.” To date, seven planets have been discovered by the Hubble Space Telescope and are named respectively as Gliese 581 a, b, c, etc. These planets have structural similarities to the earth and the Composer uses uncommon instruments like the Theremin, Waterphone, Daxaphone, Log drum, Hapi drum, Ufo drum, Vibratones and Sansula for this part of the composition to convey music as an extraterrestrial civilization.

V - Supernova

Supernovas occur when stars explode and contain an extraordinary amount of energy. In the fifth part of Universe Symphony, the Composer expresses this energy just as it's about to explode. This movement is represented by rhythmic motifs.

VI – Dark Matter

In the final part of Universe, the composer creates a contrast by using major tones for nature, minor tones for humankind, and atonality for chaos. “Dark Matter” is the evidence of the creation of the Universe, and scientists today have come up with the idea of matter called the “God Particle.” In Say's Universe this is depicted by a numbers-connected-melody related to the expansion of the universe and creating itself out of nothing. The melody progresses with 1note, 2 notes, 3 notes, 4 notes, 5 notes, 6 notes, 7 notes and is represented with a symbol. The piece ends on the note of D; considered the frequency sound of the Universe.

Meanings of the harmonic construction

1- Nature: Major Tonality
2- Human: Minor Tonality
3- Chaos: Atonality
4- D Note: Frequency sound of the Universe Void

References

External links 

 Schott Music
 Official Website

Compositions by Fazıl Say
2012 compositions
21st-century symphonies